S. niger is an abbreviation of a species name. In binomial nomenclature, the name of a species is always the name of the genus to which the species belongs, followed by the species name (also called the species epithet). In S. niger, the genus name has been abbreviated to S. and the species has been spelled out in full. In a document that uses this abbreviation, it should always be clear from the context which genus name has been abbreviated.

The Latin species epithet niger means "black". Some of the most common uses of S. niger are:
 Sciurus niger, the fox squirrel, the largest species of tree squirrel 
 Serrasalmus niger, a synonym of Serrasalmus rhombeus, the redeye piranha
 Sphodros niger, the black purse-web spider, a mygalomorph spider species from the eastern United States
 Streptanthus niger, an endangered plant species

There are many other possibilities, for example the following genus names that start with S have a species name with the epithet niger.

Vascular plants:
 Sicyos niger
 Strophanthus niger
 Syngonanthus niger

Beetles:
 Sennius niger
 Spermophagus niger
 Stenoluperus niger
 Syllitus niger

Spiders:
 Sphodros niger
 Stertinius niger
 Stiphropus niger

Other organisms:
 Saccharomyces niger, a yeast
 Saguinus niger, a monkey
 Scarus niger, a fish
 Scutovertex niger, a mite
 Siganus niger, a fish
 Stomoxys niger, an African biting fly
 Streptomyces niger, a bacterium
 Synsphyronus niger, a pseudoscorpion

See also 
 Niger (disambiguation)
 Solanum nigrum
 Sorghum nigrum